Shark Tank is an Australian reality competition television series that premiered on 8 February 2015 and aired until 7 August 2018 on Network Ten, in which aspiring entrepreneur-contestants made business presentations to a panel of "Shark" investors. Shark Tank was filmed at Fox Studios Australia.

Four seasons of the program were aired. It was announced on 31 October 2018 that the show would not return for a fifth season in 2019.

In March 2023, it was announced the series would return to Network 10 later in the year, with a new panel of investors to be confirmed, and will be produced by Curio Pictures.

Season overview

Overview
Hosted by Sarah Harris, the show featured a panel of multimillionaire investors called "Sharks" who listened to entrepreneurs pitch businesses or products they wished to develop. If one or more Sharks were interested, investment deals could be made on the show. However, if all sharks declined, contestants left with nothing. A 2018 investigation by Fairfax Media revealed that during the 2017 season, fifty pitches resulted in twenty-seven deals, of which only four actually closed.

Shark Tank has been described as demonstrating "the drama of pitch meetings and the interaction between the entrepreneurs and tycoons." Sharks were compensated for their participation but invested their own money.

History
Shark Tank was the second Australian series to be based on the show format. A previous unsuccessful adaptation, Dragons' Den (2005), aired on the Seven Network.

Shark Tank premiered on 8 February 2015 and aired 15 episodes through to 7 June 2015 with a regular timeslot of 8:00pm Sunday. It was renewed for a second season in the season finale. Season 2 premiered in 2016 with Glen Richards replacing John McGrath as a panelist. The series was renewed for a third season that began airing on 20 June 2017.

Timeline of sharks

Season ratings

References

External links

Network 10 original programming
2015 Australian television series debuts
2018 Australian television series endings
2010s Australian reality television series
English-language television shows
Television shows set in Sydney
Business-related television series
Australian television series based on Japanese television series
Australian television series based on American television series
Australian television series revived after cancellation
Shark Tank